Alex Holder is a British documentary filmmaker, founder and managing director of AJH Films.

Life and career 
Before Unprecedented Holder describes himself as a previously “pretty unknown quantity”, but he was a producer on the 2016 Tribeca film Keep Quiet. It is a 2016 documentary about an anti-Semitic politician (Csanád Szegedi, a co-founder of the far-right Hungarian political party Jobbik) who finds out he’s Jewish.

His early works also include Bad Boy Chiller Crew, a 2021 series about Bad Boy Chiller Crew, an English bassline collective from Bradford.

Unprecedented

Alex spent two years working on a documentary film about Donald Trump’s 2020 re-election campaign and the aftermath. The film premiered on July 10, 2022, on Discovery+. The three-part series features interviews with the former president; his children Ivanka, Eric and Don Jr.; Jared Kushner and former Vice President Mike Pence; as well as footage shot at the Capitol on Jan. 6.
The filmmakers have stated that the delay of the film's release was not intentional, but due to the needs of production.
According to the Holder, the Trump’s didn’t have editorial control over the documentary.

Holder was subpoenaed by the Jan 6 Committee to hand over raw footage he possessed from filming Unprecedented, in the final months of 2020 and early 2021. The Jan 6 Committee were specifically interested in "raw footage taken on 6th January 2021; raw footage of interviews with President Donald J. Trump, Donald J. Trump, Jr., Ivanka Trump, Eric Trump, Jared Kushner; and Vice President Mike Pence; raw footage pertaining to discussions of election fraud or election integrity surrounding the November 2020 presidential election". Holder testified in a closed-door deposition before the Committee on 23 June 2022.

Holder has been accused of being a British or US spy and got a security detail, appeared on CNN and MSNBC. He has been ordered to give evidence to an investigation in Georgia, too, which is looking at whether Trump pressured state officials to influence the 2020 election in the state.

Some of "the most intriguing material associated with Unprecedented" didn’t make it into the film, however it was included in the Jan 6. committee’s request for footage.

Ongoing projects

His next documentary is on the Israeli–Palestinian conflict. Among those who will take part in the film are Noam Chomsky, Nickolay Mladenov, and Tony Blair.

Filmography

Awards

References

Further reading

External links 
 
 

British documentary film directors
Living people
Year of birth missing (living people)